Transmembrane protein 171 (TMEM171) is a protein that in humans is encoded by the TMEM171 gene.

Gene

General properties 
TMEM171 is also known as PRP2 or proline-rich protein 2. It has 11,526 base pairs and 4 exons and is located on the long arm of chromosome 5, at 5q13.2, in humans. It spans from 73,120,292 to 73,131,817 on the plus strand. It is flanked by FCHO2 and TNPO1 upstream and TMEM174 downstream.

Promoter 
The predicted promoter region (GXP_7598) is 2034 base pairs long and extends past the first exon of TMEM171. Transcription factors predicted to bind to the promoter region include p63 tumor protein, CCCTC binding factors, TATA binding factors, and thyroid hormone receptors.

Expression 
TMEM171 is moderately and differentially expressed, indicating that it is neither a housekeeping gene nor a tissue-enriched gene. Its expression is highest in the thyroid, mammary gland, stomach, duodenum, and kidney. It is also expressed at moderate levels in tissues including the spleen, ileum, colon, salivary gland, and expressed at lower levels in a variety of other tissues. Conditional expression patterns of TMEM171 include decreased expression in papillary thyroid carcinoma, colon cancer, and gastric cancer, as well as increased expression in p63-depleted tissue and induced alveolar macrophages.

mRNA 

TMEM171 has isoforms 1, 2, and X1, with 4 exons each. The 3 transcripts undergo alternate in-frame splicing and are translated into proteins with 324, 323, and 305 amino acids, respectively.

RNA-binding proteins 
The 5' untranslated region has predicted sites for binding by SFRS1 and SFRS9 splicing factors and FUS, which couples transcription and splicing. The 3' untranslated region has predicted sites for binding by ELAVL1 and ZFP36, which both bind AU rich elements and may compete to stabilize or destabilize the mRNA.

Protein

General properties 
The longest protein isoform of TMEM171 is 324 amino acids in length and has an observed molecular weight of approximately 44 kDa. TMEM171 is an acidic protein overall, with a predicted isoelectric point of approximately 5.

Composition 
TMEM171 has fewer lysine residues than expected for a human protein. Despite the fact that its alias is proline-rich protein 2, TMEM171 in humans does not have more proline residues than expected; however it does have a multiplet of 6 proline residues. More distant orthologs, including Xenopus tropicalis, do have significantly more proline residues than expected. TMEM171 has 3 hydrophobic segments, which correspond with transmembrane regions.

Domains and motifs 

TMEM171 has a conserved domain, pfam15471 (aa4:318), whose structure and function are not yet characterized. Within the domain, there are 4 transmembrane domains, 2 non-cytosolic domains, and 3 cytosolic domains.

Structure 
The structure of TMEM171 consists of approximately 25% beta strands and 15% alpha helices, with coils and disordered regions making up the rest of the structure. The tertiary structure includes 2 predicted disulfide bridges, which occur between highly conserved cysteine residues in the non-cytosolic domains.

Post-translational modifications 
TMEM171 undergoes methionine cleavage and N-terminal acetylation, which is one of the most common modifications of eukaryotic proteins. N-linked glycosylation is predicted at a highly conserved NETD sequence within a non-cytosolic domain. S-palmitoylation, which enhances surface hydrophobicity and membrane affinity, is predicted at 2 cytosolic cysteine residues in TMEM171. TMEM171 is phosphorylated by unspecified kinases at several sites. It also undergoes O-ß-GlcNAc modification at 4 sites, 3 of which are Yin-Yang sites due to O-ß-GlcNAc modification and phosphorylation competing for control of protein activation or deactivation.

Localization 
TMEM171's predicted location is in the plasma membrane, with both the N- and C-termini located inside the cell.

Interacting proteins 
The proteins that are most likely to interact with TMEM171, based on affinity chromatography and two hybrid arrays, are MIER1, EMSY, CHPT1, HDLBP, NEDD4, WWOX, and TTHY3. There is strong evidence for a direct interaction between TMEM171 an MIER1, which is a transcriptional repressor that is associated with central hypothyroidism.

Clinical significance 
TMEM171 is down-regulated in papillary thyroid carcinoma and two SNPs, with the non-synonymous mutations R86G and N139K, are identified risk SNPs for papillary thyroid carcinoma. TMEM171 is also down-regulated in gastric cancer and colon cancer. More specifically, it is down-regulated in right-sided colon cancer relative to left-sided colon cancer, which typically has a better prognosis. In renal cancer, high expression of TMEM171 is a favorable prognostic marker. In triple-negative breast cancer cells, immuno-activation by tumor necrosis factor alpha (TNFα) was found to up-regulate TMEM171.

Evolution 
TMEM171 has signatures of balancing selection, which include a significant excess of polymorphisms and intermediate-frequency alleles.

Homology 
TMEM171 has no paralogs or paralogous domains. TMEM171 has 208 identified orthologs.  All orthologs are vertebrates, including mammals, amphibians, reptiles, birds, lobe-finned fish, and cartilaginous fish. The following table provides a sample of the ortholog space of TMEM171.

References 

Human proteins